This is a list of the National Register of Historic Places listings in Juab County, Utah.

This is intended to be a complete list of the properties and districts on the National Register of Historic Places in Juab County, Utah, United States.  Latitude and longitude coordinates are provided for many National Register properties and districts; these locations may be seen together in a map.

There are 23 properties and districts listed on the National Register in the county. One other site in the county was once listed, but has since been removed.



Current listings

|}

Former listing

|}

See also
 List of National Historic Landmarks in Utah
 National Register of Historic Places listings in Utah

References

External links

 
Juab
Buildings and structures in Juab County, Utah
Juab County, Utah